Linda Bond (born 22 June 1946) is a former General of the Salvation Army; she was the 19th person to hold the position. She was born in Glace Bay, Nova Scotia, Canada.

After international service and various promotions, she held the post of territorial commander of the Australian Eastern Territory from 2008. On 31 January 2011, Bond was elected by the High Council to be the next General of the Salvation Army and assumed office on 2 April 2011. She was the third woman and fourth Canadian to be elected General of the Salvation Army. General Evangeline Booth (1934–1939) and General Eva Burrows (1986–1993) were the two previous female Generals of The Salvation Army.
In late 2012, she received an honorary degree from Tyndale University College and Seminary. On 13 June 2013 she unexpectedly announced her retirement with immediate effect.

Work in The Salvation Army
Bond was commanding officer of the Kitchener corps, before serving at the college for officer training in St John's, Newfoundland, as assistant training principal, divisional secretary of the Maritime division and divisional commander of the same division.

In 1995 she was appointed to international headquarters in London as under secretary for personnel. She remained in the United Kingdom, transferring to the UK territory as divisional commander, Central North division, in 1998. A return to Canada came just over a year later, when she was appointed as chief secretary, Canada and Bermuda territory.

In July 2002 she was appointed to the USA Western territory, where she served as territorial commander and territorial president of women's ministries.

In August 2004, Bond submitted her resignation from Army officership for personal reasons. General John Larsson accepted her resignation with regret and acknowledged her outstanding contributions during her officership.

In 2008 she became territorial commander of the Australia Eastern territory. She was elected to The Salvation Army's most senior office, General, in January 2011 and assumed the office on 2 April 2011. Bond held the Office of General until her unexpected and immediate retirement on 13 June 2013.

Appointments

Retirement
After holding the Office of the General of The Salvation Army for more than two years and two months, Bond unexpectedly announced her retirement on 13 June 2013. Bond was an active Salvation Army officer for 44 years.

The High Council of The Salvation Army convened on 29 July 2013 to elect a new General, with André Cox being elected as the 20th General of The Salvation Army.
As of 2022, she is one of five surviving Generals.

References

Salvation Army officers
Living people
Canadian Salvationists
1946 births